Lakenheath railway station is on the Breckland Line in the east of England, serving the village of Lakenheath, Suffolk.

The station lies some three miles north of the village and is not within convenient walking distance of any sizeable population. However, there is a population of over 10,000 people (in Lakenheath as well as Feltwell and Hockwold cum Wilton) within a five-mile radius of the station.

Lakenheath registered just 476 passenger entries/exits in 2021/22, according to Office of Rail and Road estimates. The limited services that call at the station, on request and at weekends only, provide access to the RSPB Lakenheath Fen nature reserve immediately adjacent to the station.

Services

, on Saturdays there is one train to  departing at 11:13 and one train to  departing at 15:50, and on Sundays there are three trains to Stansted Airport and four to Norwich. There is no weekday service.

Trains stop on request only, and are operated by Greater Anglia, typically formed by brand new Class 755 diesel units which replaced the Class 170 trains used previously in 2019.

References

External links

Railway stations in Suffolk
DfT Category F2 stations
Former Great Eastern Railway stations
Railway stations in Great Britain opened in 1845
Greater Anglia franchise railway stations
Railway request stops in Great Britain
Lakenheath